is a railway station in the city of Ichinomiya, Aichi Prefecture, Japan, operated by Meitetsu.

Lines

Station layout
The station has one elevated side platform, serving a single bi-directional track with the station building underneath.  The station has automated ticket machines, Manaca automated turnstiles and is unattended.

Adjacent stations

|-
!colspan=5|Nagoya Railroad

Station history
Nishi-Ichinomiya Station was opened on August 4, 1914. The tracks were elevated in 1994.

Passenger statistics
In fiscal 2013, the station was used by an average of 348 passengers daily.

Surrounding area
Japan National Route 155

See also
 List of Railway Stations in Japan

References

External links

 Official web page 

Railway stations in Japan opened in 1914
Railway stations in Aichi Prefecture
Stations of Nagoya Railroad
Ichinomiya, Aichi